Cecepy Bikin Happy (Cecepy Makes You Happy) was an Indonesian reality show, hosted by Ayu Ting Ting, Julia Perez, Zaskia Gotik, Mumuk Gomez and Tarra Budiman. The hour-long show made its debut on February 29, 2016, and ended a few months later on June 28, 2016.

The variety show had been nominated for Favorite Music/Variety Show Program at the 2016 Panasonic Gobel Awards; however, it lost to Dahsyat.

Controversy 
Host Zaskia Gotik stopped appearing in the show due to case of alleged harassment of the Indonesian state symbol. Gotik said she would come back to the show after the case had ended. Gotik denied that she had been fired from the show as a result.

Cast 
 Ayu Ting Ting
 Julia Perez
 Zaskia Gotik
 Mumuk Gomez
 Tarra Budiman

Awards and nominations

References

External links 

 

2016 Indonesian television series debuts
2016 Indonesian television series endings
RCTI original programming
Indonesian reality television series